Tristeirometa decussata is a moth of the family Geometridae first described by Frederic Moore in 1868. It is found in north-eastern India and Taiwan.

The larvae feed on the leaves of Rosa, Citrus and Malus species. They are very variable in colour, matching the colour of the leaves on which they feed. The colour ranges from yellow green with a pinkish lateral line to orange pink and green tinged with bronze or green with a crimson and yellow lateral line.

Subspecies
Tristeirometa decussata decussata (India)
Tristeirometa decussata moltrechti (Prout, 1958) (Taiwan)

References

Moths described in 1868
Trichopterygini